Verrucarin A is a chemical compound that belongs in the class of trichothecenes, a group of sesquiterpene toxins produced by several fungi, namely from the Fusarium species, that are responsible for infecting food grains.  Within the skeleton of the basic trichothecene structure, the olefin and epoxide are crucial for toxicity; ester functionalities and hydroxyl groups often contribute to the toxicity, thereby rendering verrucarin A as one of the most lethal examples. The mechanism of action for this class of toxins mainly inhibits protein biosynthesis by preventing peptidyl transferase activity. Although initially thought to be potentially useful as anticancer therapeutics, numerous examples of trichothecene derivatives were shown to be too toxic for clinical use.

Biosynthesis
Verrucarin A is classified as a type D trichothecene based on its substitution pattern in the 12,13-epoxytrichothec-9-ene (EPT) core structure. Type D differs from types A, B and C by containing an additional ring linking the C-4 and C-15 position. 
Trichothecenes are generally formed via the mevalonate pathway beginning with the precursor farnesyl pyrophosphate (FPP). After cyclization of FPP to form trichodiene, TRI4 encodes a cytochrome P450 enzyme to catalyze a series of oxygenation events. Upon the addition of three oxygens at C-2, C-11 and the C-12,13 epoxide, the intermediate isotrichodiol is formed. Isotrichodiol then isomerizes, yielding the tricothecane EPT core structure. Subsequently, it is proposed that a series of hydroxylations and acylations occur at C-15 and C-4 which then cyclize at these carbons.

References 

Sesquiterpenes